José Augusto Santana dos Santos (born 14 March 1977 in Rosário do Catete, Sergipe), commonly known as Guga, is a Brazilian retired footballer who played as an attacking midfielder.

He spent most of his professional career in Portugal, representing five clubs over the course of eight Primeira Liga seasons (11 years in total).

External links

1977 births
Living people
Sportspeople from Sergipe
Brazilian footballers
Association football midfielders
Primeira Liga players
Liga Portugal 2 players
Gil Vicente F.C. players
C.F. Os Belenenses players
Vitória S.C. players
Boavista F.C. players
S.C. Olhanense players
Super League Greece players
Athlitiki Enosi Larissa F.C. players
Brazilian expatriate footballers
Expatriate footballers in Portugal
Expatriate footballers in Greece
Brazilian expatriate sportspeople in Portugal
Brazilian expatriate sportspeople in Greece